His Foreign Wife is a 1927 American silent drama film directed by John P. McCarthy and starring Greta von Rue, Edna Murphy and Wallace MacDonald.

Synopsis
Along with his brother, a young man enlists to fight in World War I. Although his brother is killed, he returns home a hero. However the people of his town are shocked that he has married a German woman and refuse to accept her.

Cast
 Greta von Rue as Hilda Schultzenbach 
 Edna Murphy as Mary Jackson 
 Wallace MacDonald as Johnny Haines 
 Charles Clary as The Mayor 
 Elsie Bishop as Frau Schultzenbach 
 Lee Shumway

References

Bibliography
 Munden, Kenneth White. The American Film Institute Catalog of Motion Pictures Produced in the United States, Part 1. University of California Press, 1997.

External links
 

1927 films
1927 drama films
1920s English-language films
American silent feature films
Silent American drama films
American black-and-white films
Films directed by John P. McCarthy
Pathé Exchange films
American World War I films
1920s American films